Benjamin Franklin Award for Public Diplomacy is an American award by the United States Department of State which recognizes individuals, foundations, associations, and corporations that actively contribute to advancing America's ideals around the globe through public diplomacy. The award is named in honor of Benjamin Franklin because, as the nation's first envoy, he was "known for his creative ways of using culture, business and science to attract the attention of foreign audiences".

The establishment of the award was announced by US Secretary of State Condoleezza Rice in January 2007, as the most prestigious honor that the Department of State can bestow on U.S. citizens and non-governmental organizations, giving special emphasis to activities that:
provide hope and opportunities in the core areas of education, culture, and information
empower, educate, and inspire key audiences such as women, students, and educators
engage under-served communities and grassroots organizations.

The awards are presented in four categories: 
Individuals
Corporations
Academic institutions (schools, universities, etc.)
Not-for-profit organizations (non-governmental organizations, foundations, associations, etc.)

Recipients

2016
 Individual Category Winner: Eric Treene, Ehsan Zaffar, Catherine Newcombe – for their work on advancing religious freedom issues under United Nations Human Rights Council Resolution 16/18.

2008
Non-Profit Category Award Winner: Search for Common Ground
Academic Category Award Winner: University of Southern California
Corporate Category Award Winner: Johnson & Johnson
Individual Category Award Winner: Dave Brubeck

See also
Awards of the United States Department of State

References

Awards and decorations of the United States Foreign Service